Nathaniel Paul (died July 1839) was a Baptist minister and abolitionist who worked in Albany, New York, Wilberforce Colony in Canada, and traveled to the United Kingdom to raise support to aid African Americans. He was a brother of Thomas Paul.

In 1827 he gave a speech celebrating the abolition of slavery in New York. His comments included the statement:

Paul was involved in fundraising efforts for Wilberforce Colony in Canada, a settlement that included African Americans fleeing violent attacks in Cincinnati, Ohio (the colony was named after British abolitionist statesman William Wilberforce). He went to the United Kingdom (England, Ireland, and Scotland) to gain support and stayed there from 1832 until 1835. On January 14, 1832, the abolitionist newspaper, The Liberator, published a letter from Paul about his trip to England; According to historian John Leverton,  Paul returned in 1835 "with over $7,000 in collections, but his expenses totaled over $8,000, leaving the Colony with a substantial debt."

Paul left the Colony shortly after his return from the United Kingdom and returned to Albany, where he died in 1839.

References

 

1839 deaths
Year of birth uncertain

Religious leaders from Albany, New York
African-American abolitionists